Ugboha is a town in Esan South Local Government of Edo State Nigeria. Ugboha lies on the geographical coordinate of latitude .

References 

Populated places in Edo State